Gask is a surname. Notable people with the surname include: 

 Arthur Gask (1869–1951), British novelist
 Lilian Gask (1865–1942), British author of children's books

See also
 Gass (surname)
 Gast
 Rask (surname)